Alys Nicole Williams (born 28 May 1994) is an American water polo player. She is a member of the United States women's national water polo team, and participated in the 2020 Tokyo Summer Olympics, where she won a gold medal.

Career highlights 

 2015 World Championship (gold)
 2017 World Championship (gold)
 2019 World Championship (gold)
 2020 Tokyo Summer Olympics (gold)

Personal life 
Williams was born in Fountain Valley, California to Robert and Constance Williams. She grew up in Huntington Beach and attended Edison High School. She has two sisters. Williams attended UCLA, majoring in psychology.

References 

American female water polo players
1994 births
Living people
University of California, Los Angeles alumni
Olympic gold medalists for the United States in water polo
Water polo players at the 2020 Summer Olympics
Medalists at the 2020 Summer Olympics